

Cynered, (or Coenred) was a Bishop of Selsey.

Cynered received a confirmation from Coelwulf, King of Mercia, between 821 and 823 of the land originally granted by Noðhelm to his sister Noðgyð.

Cynered was present at a synod æt Astran in 839. Cynered's bishopric can be dated approximately to (in or before 821-823) to (in or after 839), and that is much as the historical evidence permits.

Cynered died some time between 839 and 845.

Citations

References

Further reading

External links
 

Bishops of Selsey
9th-century English bishops